Olivier Dumont (born 6 March 2002) is a Belgian professional football player who plays for Sint-Truiden .

Club career 
A pure product of Standard Liège youth system, Dumont first joined the club's professional squad in the preparation of the 2021–22 season.

On 11 June 2020, Dumont signed his first professional contract with Standard Liège.

He made his professional debut for Standard Liège on the 23 July 2021, replacing João Klauss in the opening game of the 2021–22 Belgian First Division; a 1-1 home draw against KRC Genk.

On 21 October 2021, Dumont signed a new contract with Standard Liège.

On 8 June 2022, Dumont signed with Sint-Truiden.

References

External links
 
 
 Olivier Dumont at Jupiler Pro League
 Olivier Dumont at Standard de Liège

2002 births
Living people
Belgian footballers
Belgium youth international footballers
Association football midfielders
People from Visé
Standard Liège players
Sint-Truidense V.V. players
Belgian Pro League players
Footballers from Liège Province